Vidya Bhawan Mahila College is a degree college in Siwan, Bihar, India. It is a constituent unit of Jai Prakash University. The college offers intermediate and three years degree course (TDC) in arts.

History 
The college was established in the year 1977.

Departments 

 Arts
 Hindi
 Urdu
  English
 Sanskrit
 Philosophy
 Economics
 Political Science
 History
 Geography
 Psychology
 Music
 Home Science

References

External links 

 Jai Prakash University website

Colleges in India
Constituent colleges of Jai Prakash University
Educational institutions established in 1977
1977 establishments in Bihar
Women's universities and colleges in Bihar